Shepparton (Yortayorta: Kanny-goopna) is a city located on the floodplain of the Goulburn River in northern Victoria, Australia, approximately  north-northeast of Melbourne. As of the 2021 census, the estimated population of Shepparton, including the adjacent town of Mooroopna, was 68,409.

It began as a sheep station and river crossing in the mid-19th century, before undergoing a major transformation as a railway town. Today it is an agricultural and manufacturing centre, and the centre of the Goulburn Valley irrigation system, one of the largest centres of irrigation in Australia. It is also a major regional service city and the seat of local government and civic administration for the City of Greater Shepparton, which includes the surrounding towns of Tatura, Merrigum, Mooroopna, Murchison, Dookie, Toolamba and Grahamvale.

Toponymy 
The name of Shepparton is derived from the surname of one of the area's first European settlers, Sherbourne Sheppard, and not, as is sometimes imagined, from Shepperton, England.

The Yorta Yorta name for the area is 'Kanny-goopna' with 'goopna' meaning 'deep waterholes by which people camped'. The name for the junction of the Broken and Goulburn rivers is 'Marangan', meaning deep pond or lagoon in an unknown Eastern Kulin language.

History 
Prior to the European settlement of Australia, the area was inhabited by the Yorta Yorta, the indigenous Australian people whose country covers the junction of the Goulburn and Murray Rivers in present-day northern Victoria and southern New South Wales. The town of Shepparton and surrounds are on the country of the Kailtheban clan of the Yorta Yorta nation.

Surveyor General Thomas Mitchell was the first European to be recorded traveling through the area, crossing the Goulburn River in 1836 on his return to Sydney from an expedition to survey the Darling River and its tributaries. On Mitchell's recommendation, Joseph Hawdon and Charles Bonney would follow two years later, camping on the town site by the Goulburn River in 1838 while droving cattle from Albury to Adelaide.

The first permanent settlement in the area was the "Tallygaroopna" sheep station, established in the early 1840s. By 1843 the station was being run by a man named Sherbourne Sheppard, the town's eventual namesake. With the advent of the Victorian gold rush in the 1850s, the area became a popular river crossing point for miners travelling east from the Bendigo and Ballarat goldfields. As there was no bridge across the Goulburn River, Irish entrepreneur Patrick Macguire set up a punt service to ferry travellers across the river, erecting the town's first building in the process, the punt house. Macguire sold the building to John Hill in 1853, who converted it into a hotel, the Emu Bush Inn. This settlement soon became known as Macguire's Punt, a name it would keep into the 1870s. A post office opened in February 1854, but closed in July that same year.

The settlement was first surveyed in 1855 by Assistant Surveyor J.G.W. Wilmot. By this time, in addition to Macguire's Punt, it had also become known as Sheppard town, Sheppardton, and Shepparton. The post office reopened in May 1858, and two years later the Governor of Victoria officially declared Shepparton a township on 24 September 1860. It remained a small settlement of a half-dozen buildings into the 1870s despite adding a police station, a general store, a blacksmith, a foundry, and a public hall which remains the city's oldest building. Shepparton's first bridge over the Goulburn River was completed in 1878 and named Dainton's Bridge after James Henry Dainton, the bridge's chief engineer. The first church, St. Patrick's, opened in 1879.

The railway from Seymour reached the town in 1880. A mechanics institute opened between 1880 and 1888 as Shepparton rapidly developed into a major manufacturing and service center.

During the Victorian railway boom the railways expanded, and by the turn of the century Shepparton was central to a large network of regional branch lines on the Toolamba–Echuca railway line — lines leading to Cobram, Nathalia, Dookie, Picola and Katamatite. Rail-served industries helped Shepparton grow into a city. While these lines experienced a brief boom, almost all of them would later close. The Goulburn River also developed as a secondary transport hub, with paddle steamers and ferries operating at The Barges.

In the post-war era the city's population virtually tripled, with immigration to the city becoming a major factor, particularly migrants from Italy. During the post-war boom of the 1960s and '70s successive local councils began a progress campaign to modernise the city and many older buildings were replaced with newer buildings.

Geography

Climate 
Shepparton has a cold semi-arid climate (Köppen climate classification: BSk) climate, with hot summers and cool winters.

Although the rainfall in Shepparton is fairly sparse, winter sees the most rain days. Rainfall is quite low throughout the year.

The average wind speed in Shepparton is 4.03 metres per second.

Urban structure

Central business district 

The Maude Street Mall is the city's main shopping centre, while Wyndham Street is the main civic and commercial street. The observation deck offers views over the city and surrounding countryside.

Suburbs 
Shepparton has three nearby towns which could be considered suburbs. They are Mooroopna to the west, Kialla (and Kialla Lakes house and land subdivision) to the south, and Shepparton East to the east. Nearby, in the northeast, also lies the locality of Grahamvale.

Economy 

Shepparton's main industries are agriculture and associated manufacturing. Australia's largest processor of canned fruits, SPC Ardmona, has a production facility in Shepparton. Seasonal fruits, such as peaches, pears and apricots are preserved into a variety of packaging.

The manufacturing industry has evolved to cater for the needs of local primary producers.

Other major manufacturers in the city include Campbells Soup Company, Rubicon Water, and Pental.

Shepparton is a major regional commercial and shopping centre and service economy for the Greater Shepparton area. Major retailers in Shepparton include Target, Kmart, Harris Scarfe (formerly Fairleys Department Store), Bunnings Warehouse, Rebel, The Reject Shop, Repco, Supercheap Auto, Autobarn and Dimmeys.

Shepparton is a major centre for infrastructure and civic services. The majority of the region's emergency response facilities are located there. The administrative headquarters for the Country Fire Authority (CFA) District 22 and one of only two Independent Rescue Agencies in Victoria are located in Shepparton. The Search and Rescue Squad originally started out as a "Dive and Recovery Unit" recovering lost property and persons from the rivers, lakes and water ways in the region.

Arts and culture 
The city hosts the Moooving Art project, which involves local artists painting fibreglass cows, which are then displayed in tourist locations throughout the city and surrounding townships. The project is an artistic representation of the strong dairy industry prevalent in the Shepparton area.

Kidstown is Located between Shepparton and Mooroopna, it has two giant slides, a  flying fox and a train that goes right around the playground.

The city is home to a large swimming centre called Aquamoves, two performing arts centres, one in Mooroopna named WestSide, due to its geographical location and the other the Eastbank Centre located in Shepparton (which houses the centres' box office). Collectively the centres are called Riverlinks Venues".

Shepparton is also home of the Shepparton Art Museum, more commonly known as SAM. SAM houses the world's most significant collection of Australian ceramics, and is home to the biennial Sidney Myer Fund Australian Ceramic Award and the Indigenous Ceramic Art Award. The museum features the surrealist sculpture Woman and Child by artist Sam Jinks.

Shepparton is also home to the Shepparton Theatre Arts Group (STAG), the city's premier theatrical group. STAG was formed in 1975 after an amalgamation between the Shepparton Dramatic Society and the Shepparton Light Music Company. The group presents one dramatic/comedic play, one musical and one rock revue each year. The Goulburn Valley Concert Orchestra, a community symphony orchestra, gives an annual major concert and a series of cafe concerts every year.

 Sport 
Shepparton is home to the John McEwen Reserve, a sports field which is part of the Greater Shepparton Regional Sports Precinct. The complex contains space for a variety of sports including soccer, AFL, netball and others. It was redeveloped by the state and federal governments and opened in 2017. It is named after John McEwen, the Prime Minister of Australia from 19 December 1967 to 10 January 1968. The ground has a capacity of 3,200 and is the home ground for a number of teams including the Goulburn Valley Suns, and has hosted a number of matches in the A and W soccer leagues.

Australian Rules Football is popular in Shepparton, which fields five clubs. The main league, called the Goulburn Valley Football League (GVFL), includes 3 teams from the city; the Shepparton Bears, Shepparton Swans and Shepparton United, with Mooroopna also fielding a team. There are also other smaller leagues, such as the Murray Football League, Kyabram & District Football League and the which have teams from in and around Greater Shepparton (Rumbalara and Shepparton East respectively). There is also a junior league in the schools (SDJFA). The city plays a major role in a team where the Australian Football League (AFL) frequently scouts for new talents to AFL clubs, which is the Murray Bushrangers.

Association Football is also popular in Shepparton with four senior clubs entering teams into competitions run by the North Eastern Soccer League; Shepparton (formerly Lemnos), Shepparton South and Shepparton United Teams are entered in men's, women's, boys' and girls' divisions.Shepparton is also home to the Goulburn Valley Suns Football Club. The soccer club was established in 2013, and currently competes in the National Premier Leagues.

Basketball is another popular sport in Shepparton. The Shepparton Lady Gators represent the Shepparton and Mooroopna region in women's basketball playing in the Big V division two competition. The men's team has gone into an extended recess after being one of the most successful country-based basketball teams in Australia, winning the CVIBL title in 1994 and the 2000, 2001 and 2003 Big V Championship ABA titles under the tutelage of Russell Parker. In 2011, the men's team returned to the court in the Country basketball league.

Shepparton has a rugby union club known as the Bulls who compete in the Rugby Victoria Premiership.

Cycling is popular in Shepparton due to the flat terrain and extensive network of routes. The Goulburn Valley Hospice runs the annual Shepparton Fruit Loop Ride for cyclists. There is a velodrome facility located in the city's north and a world class BMX track as well as an extensive range of bike paths throughout the city and surrounding areas.

Shepparton Harness Racing Club conducts regular meetings at its racetrack in the city. The Shepparton Greyhound Racing Club holds regular greyhound racing meetings at its track on the Goulburn Valley Highway, Kialla, which opened on 10 December 2005. Previously the racing had been held at the Shepparton Showgrounds from 1973 until 2005.

Shepparton formerly had a rugby league team, known as the Warriors, who competed in the Murray Cup competition during the 2000s.

Shepparton is also home to the Goulburn Valley Hockey Association. Hockey, whilst not having as great a following in previous years, still has a strong competition. The Shepparton field was resurfaced in 2015 with works to commence on a second field in the near future. The Goulburn Valley Hockey Association fields men's, women's and junior teams from the Shepparton Strikers, Shepparton Youth Club, Mooroopna, Benalla, Echuca and Euroa. The Hockey Association also features in State Hockey Championships for men and women at both Senior and Masters competitions and also provide teams for the Junior Country Championships.

Golfers play at the course of the Shepparton Golf Club on Golf Drive.

 Military 
The Royal Australian Navy has named two warships HMAS Shepparton after the city, and the 8th/7th Battalion of the Royal Victoria Regiment has a depot in the city's southeast.

 Demographics 

In the 2021 Census, there were 53,841 people in Shepparton - Mooroopna. Aboriginal and/or Torres Strait Islander people made up 4.3% of the population. 73.1% of people were born in Australia. The next most common countries of birth were India 3.5%, Afghanistan 1.4%, England 1.3%, Malaysia 1.2% and the Phillipines 1.1%.  72.1% of people only spoke English at home. Other languages spoken at home included Punjabi 2.7%, Arabic 2.6%, Hazaraghi 1.5%, Italian 1.5% and Mandarin 1.1%.

 Religion 
The most common responses for religion were No Religion 33.4%, Catholic 22.3% and Anglican 8.3%. Christianity was the largest religious group reported overall (48.5%) (this figure excludes not stated responses).

The neighboring town of Orrvale contained a small Jewish community from 1913, which disbanded in 1966. In 2015, the City of Shepparton commemorated the site of the Jewish community's synagogue with a monument.

Shepparton is home to a multicultural Muslim community numbering some 3,500 (5.5%). There are 4 mosques in the city (Shia: Afghan, Iraqi; Sunni: Turkish, Albanian). The Shepparton Albanian Mosque is the first and oldest mosque in Victoria, built (late 1950s) by Albanian Australians whose local presence dates back to the interwar period.

 Governance 

 

Shepparton is the seat of local government and administrative centre for the City of Greater Shepparton Local Government Area. The council was formed in 1994 from the amalgamation of the City of Shepparton, Shire of Shepparton, and parts of the Shire of Rodney, Shire of Euroa, Shire of Goulburn, Shire of Tungamah, Shire of Violet Town and Shire of Waranga. The council office complex is located at 90 Welsford Street and the council meets in the Chambers there. The council consists of nine councillors, elected once every four years by postal voting.

In state politics, Shepparton is located in the Legislative Assembly district of Shepparton which had been safely held by the National/Country Party since the seat was created in 1945. In the 2014 Victorian state election, Independent candidate Suzanna Sheed won the seat, with former mayor Kim O'Keefe winning the seat back for the Nationals in 2022.

In federal politics, Shepparton is located in a single House of Representatives division—the Division of Nicholls. The Division, formerly the Division of Murray, has been a safe Coalition seat since its inception in 1949 and was the seat of John McEwen, 18th Prime Minister of Australia, as well the seat of Sharman Stone, currently Ambassador of Australia for Women and Girls, who served as member of parliament for the Division of Murray from 1996 to 2016.

Law enforcement is overseen from regional police headquarters in Welsford Street. It is one of two police stations in the urban area, with the second at Mooroopna and administers stations in several surrounding towns in the LGA. Justice is conducted at the Shepparton Courts complex at 14 High Street, a multi-jurisdictional centre that includes a Magistrates' Court, County Court, Victorian Civil and Administrative Tribunal (VCAT) and Coroners Court. Corrections, are handled locally at the Community Correctional Centre on Wyndham Street.

Public safety and emergency services are provided by several state funded organisations including local volunteer based organisations.  Storms and flooding are handled by the State Emergency Service (SES). Bushfires are handled by the Country Fire Authority.

 Education 
Shepparton has numerous primary schools, such as state schools Bourchier Street Primary, Gowrie Street Primary, Guthrie Street Primary, St Georges Road Primary School, Grahamvale Primary, Kialla West Primary, Kialla Primary, Wilmot Road Primary, Shepparton East Primary and Orrvale Primary. Catholic primary schools include St. Brendan's (shares a campus with Notre Dame College, Shepparton), St. Mel's and St. Lukes (shares a location with Notre Dame College, Shepparton Emmaus Campus.) It also has two schools catering for students with disabilities, called Verney Road School and Berry Street School.

There were seven secondary schools in the Shepparton Region: Mooroopna Secondary College; McGuire College; Shepparton Ace College; Shepparton High School; Wanganui Park Secondary College; the Catholic Notre Dame College; the private Goulburn Valley Grammar School. However, in 2020, 4 of these schools (McGuire College, Shepparton High School, Mooroopna Secondary College and Wanganui Park Secondary College) merged to form the Greater Shepparton Secondary College (GSSC), using previous school sites as campuses while the GSSC buildings are being constructed on the previous site of Shepparton High School.

The University of Melbourne's School of Rural Health and Rural Clinical School of the Faculty of Medicine, Dentistry and Health Sciences are also based in Shepparton.

La Trobe University also has a campus offering a range of degree programs including Arts, Business/Commerce, Nursing/Health Sciences, and Education. Approximately 400 students attend the university which provides day, evening, part-time, and full-time study options.

Goulburn Ovens Institute of TAFE has three campuses, one in Fryers Street which hosts the organisation's administration department as well as many teaching departments, the William Orr Campus, a 120 hectare property in Wanganui Road and another newer campus located in the vicinity of the McGuire College Australian Rules Football field and bus stop on Archer Street.

 Transport 

The city is located at the junction of the Midland Highway and the Goulburn Valley Highway, the latter which is being progressively converted to freeway standard. The Peter Ross-Edwards Causeway connects Shepparton to Mooroopna.

V/Line runs bus coach services to Wangaratta, Bendigo and Griffith, New South Wales. A dedicated bus service to Shepparton from Melbourne Airport is also run twice daily passing through Seymour and Nagambie.

Shepparton railway station is serviced by V/Line rail services on the Shepparton line to and from Melbourne and to Mooroopna.

Shepparton Airport, located south of the city on the Goulburn Valley Highway and is home to Gawne Aviation.
Shepparton also has buses that run around the suburbs and Mooroopna

 Media 

 Newspapers 
The Shepparton Adviser is a free newspaper delivered to a CAB-audited 32,004 homes, farms and businesses each week. This circulation equates to a conservative readership estimate of 70,000 per week (Circulation Audit Bureau) and includes direct delivery to 1,500 local RMB addresses via Australia Post. The Shepparton Adviser is independently owned and is the largest circulating established free newspaper in the Goulburn and Murray Valleys.

The Shepparton News is a paid morning daily newspaper published by the McPherson Media Group. It has an audited average daily distribution of 12–14,000. From the same publisher, The Country News, with an audited circulation of 55,000 is aimed at the farming community in the Goulburn Valley and surrounding regions, and is included as an insert in the Shepparton News, Riverine Herald (Echuca), Seymour Telegraph, Cobram Courier, McIvor Times (Heathcote), Pastoral Times (Deniliquin), Benalla Ensign, Euroa Gazette, Southern Riverina News (Finley), Kyabram Free Press and the Campaspe Valley News (Rochester).

 Radio stations 
 Radio National 621 AM / 756 AM (government-funded, mostly news, current affairs and the arts)
 ABC Radio Melbourne 774 AM (government-funded, mostly news and talkback)
 RSN Racing & Sport 1260 AM (narrowcast)
 Vision Radio Network 1413 AM (Christian and Gospel) – service operated by United Christian Broadcasters Australia Pty Ltd
 Raw FM 87.6 FM (dance music station)
 Triple J 94.5 FM (government-funded Youth Radio)
 Triple M Goulburn Valley 95.3 FM (commercial)
 ABC Classic FM 96.1 FM (government-funded, classical music station)
 Hit96.9 96.9 FM (commercial) – formerly known as Star FM, originally Sun FM.
 ABC Shepparton 97.7 FM (government-funded local news, current affairs, light entertainment and talkback)
 ONE FM 98.5 FM (community / not-for-profit)
 Radio for the Print Handicapped 100.1 FM
 ABC NewsRadio 107.7 FM (government-funded national news, current affairs and parliamentary broadcasts)

 Television stations 
Shepparton is served by three commercial television networks and two publicly owned services:

 ABC  (plus ABC HD, ABC TV Plus, ABC Kids, ABC Me & ABC News)
 SBS  (plus SBS HD, SBS Viceland, SBS World Movies, SBS World Watch, SBS Food, NITV & ICTV)
 Prime7  (plus 7HD, 7TWO, 7mate, 7flix, 7Bravo & Racing.com)
 WIN (plus 9HD, 9Gem, 9Go! & 9Life)
 Southern Cross 10 (plus 10 HD, 10 Bold, 10 Peach, 10 Shake, Sky News Regional & TVSN)

The new digital channels broadcast by all the networks in addition to the main stations are available on Freeview to viewers in Shepparton and the wider Goulburn and Murray Valley regions.

Of the three main commercial networks:
WIN Television (previously GMV-6 and 'Television Victoria') airs a half-hour local WIN News each weeknight at 6pm, produced from a newsroom in the city and broadcast from studios in Wollongong.
Southern Cross 10 airs short local news and weather updates throughout the day.
Prime7 airs short local news and weather updates throughout the day, produced and broadcast from its Canberra studios.

Southern Cross previously aired Weeknights'', a local news magazine program each weeknight from March 2011 before ceasing local production in June 2015.

On 5 May 2011, analogue television transmissions ceased in regional Victoria and some border regions including the Goulburn Valley and parts of the Southern Riverina in New South Wales. All local free-to-air television services are now broadcasting in digital transmission only as part of the Federal Government's plan for Digital terrestrial television in Australia.

Notable people

Academia 
Thomas Shadrach James – Linguist and herbalist
Avni Sali – Surgeon and academic

Arts and music 
 Adam Briggs – Musician
 Anson Cameron – Author
 Adam Donovan – Musician and founder of Augie March
 Joseph Furphy – Author
 Amanda Garner – Ballroom dancer
 Edward Harrington – Poet and author
 Sir Bernard Thomas Heinze – Musician
 John Longstaff – Painter 
 Clint Morris – Film producer
 Glenn Richards – Musician and founder of Augie March
 Danielle Rowe – Ballerina/choreographer

Politics and business 
 Douglas Alexandra – Architect
 Kaye Darveniza – Politician
 Damian Drum – Politician
 John Furphy – Inventor of the Furphy water-cart
 Don Kilgour – Politician and broadcaster 
 Wendy Lovell – Politician
 Kim O'Keefe – Politician and Businesswoman
 Jeanette Powell – Politician
 Richard Pratt – Businessman
 John Richardson – Politician and author
 Suzanna Sheed – Politician and lawyer
Sharman Stone – Former Politician and current diplomat, activist
Jim Short – Politician and diplomat
 Peter Ross-Edwards – Politician

Sport 
 Michael Barlow – Australian rules footballer
Alou Kuol – Footballer for VfB Stuttgart
 Aiden Blizzard – Cricketer
 Marc Bullen – Australian rules footballer
 Will Brodie – Australian rules footballer
 Shannon Byrnes – Australian rules footballer
Max Carlos – Boxer
 Justin Davies – Australian rules footballer
 Louise Dobson – Field hockey fullback at the 1996 Olympics
 Kevin Doolan – Australian Motorcycle speedway racer
 Robert Enes – Footballer
 Angela Foley – Australian rules footballer
 Shaun Hart – Australian rules footballer
 Jarman Impey – Australian rules footballer
 Garry Jacobson − Supercars champion 
 Glenn James – Australian rules football umpire
 Nikos Kalafatis – Soccer player
 Alex Keath – Cricketer and Australian rules footballer
 Steven King – Australian rules footballer
 Frankie Lagana – Footballer
 Brett Lancaster – Cyclist
 Vince Lia – Footballer
 Jarrod Lyle – Golfer
 Lee Naylor – Athlete
 Doug Palmer – Australian rules footballer
 Dwight Ritchie − Boxer
 Steele Sidebottom – Australian rules footballer
 Grant Thompson − Australian rules footballer
 Jason Traianidis – Australian rules footballer
 David Wirrpanda – Australian rules footballer
 Adem Yze – Australian rules footballer

Clubs and associations 
 Shepparton Toastmasters (public speaking) 
 Goulburn Valley Chinese Association (social connection)

See also 
 Electoral district of Shepparton

References

External links 

 Official City Council website
 Official visitor information website

Cities in Victoria (Australia)
City of Greater Shepparton
 
1860 establishments in Australia
Populated places established in 1860